Nebria coreica is a species of ground beetle in the Nebriinae subfamily that can be found in North Korea and Russia.

References

coreica
Beetles described in 1875
Beetles of Asia